Comet Skorichenko–George (sometimes spelled Scorichenko–George) is also designated C/1989 Y1, 1990 VI, and 1989e1. It was discovered on December 17, 1989 by Doug George of Kanata (near Ottawa), Ontario, Canada, and Soviet astronomer Boris Skoritchenko (Mezmay, Krasnodar Krai). Skoritchenko was using 8×20 binoculars, whilst George was using a 16" reflector and had searched for 65 hours. The comet was magnitude 10.5 in the northern evening sky. It passed its perihelion on April 11, 1990 at a distant 1.57 AU, and remained in the Earth's evening sky through April 1990, at magnitude 9–10.

C2 emission bands were observed in the comet Skorichenko-George.

References

External links
 Saguaro Astronomy Club News, #157, February 1990

Non-periodic comets
1989 in science
19891217